Faith Chapel is a historic chapel on Old Plantation Road in Jekyll Island, Georgia and was built in 1904.  It was used as a non-denominational chapel until 1942.  The state of Georgia purchased it along with Jekyll Island in 1947.  It is administered by the Jekyll Island State Park Authority and was opened to the public in 1970.   It has a wood "A" frame and a brick foundation. The interior and exterior walls are shingled, with gargoyles that are replicas of the ones at Notre Dame Cathedral.  The chapel was added to the National Register of Historic Places in 1971 and it is open to the public.

It has stained-glass windows. One is "David's Window" which was made by Louis Comfort Tiffany; the other is "The Adoration of the Christ Child" by Maitland Armstrong and his daughter, Helen Maitland Armstrong.

Photos

References

External links
 

Historic districts in Georgia (U.S. state)
Individually listed contributing properties to historic districts on the National Register in Georgia (U.S. state)
Churches in Georgia (U.S. state)
Properties of religious function on the National Register of Historic Places in Georgia (U.S. state)
Shingle Style architecture in Georgia (U.S. state)
Churches completed in 1904
Buildings and structures in Glynn County, Georgia
National Register of Historic Places in Glynn County, Georgia
Jekyll Island